Strikeforce: Diaz vs. Noons II, was a mixed martial arts event held by Strikeforce on October 9, 2010 at the HP Pavilion in San Jose, California, United States.  The event aired live on the Showtime cable network.

Background

This event featured the rematch of Nick Diaz and K. J. Noons after the first bout was stopped because of a cut on the head of Diaz for the Elite XC 160 lbs championship.

As part of the undercard, Strikeforce hosted the Bay Area Regional Finals of the California Amateur MMA Organization.

Strikeforce debuted their final logo and branding at this event.

The event drew an estimated 350,000 viewers, with a peak at 509,000 on Showtime.

Results

Reported payout

Nick Diaz: $50,000 (no win bonus) def. K. J. Noons $10,000 
Josh Thomson: $50,000 (no win bonus) def. Gesias "JZ" Cavalcante: $40,000
Marloes Coenen: $3,000 ($1,000 win bonus) def. Sarah Kaufman: $20,000
Tyron Woodley: $15,000 ($7,500 win bonus) def. André Galvão: $10,000
James Terry: $3,000 ($1,500 win bonus) def. David Marshall: $1,500 
Josh McDonald: $3,000 ($1,500 win bonus) def. Ron Keslar: $1,500
Jess Bouscal: $3,000 ($1,500 win bonus) def. Luis Mendoza: $1,500

References

See also
 Strikeforce (mixed martial arts)
 List of Strikeforce champions
 List of Strikeforce events
 2010 in Strikeforce

Diaz vs. Noons II
2010 in mixed martial arts
Mixed martial arts in San Jose, California
2010 in sports in California
Events in San Jose, California